Vivaro is a comune (municipality) in the Province of Pordenone in the Italian region Friuli-Venezia Giulia, located about  northwest of Trieste and about  northeast of Pordenone.

Vivaro borders the following municipalities: Arba, Cordenons, Maniago, San Giorgio della Richinvelda, San Quirino, and Spilimbergo.

References

Cities and towns in Friuli-Venezia Giulia